Humboldt Street was a train station along the Evergreen Branch of the Long Island Rail Road. The station was originally built on May 15, 1878. The platform area extended between Humboldt Street and Graham Street.

History
Humboldt Street was .99 miles from the terminal at Greenpoint and the fare was 5 cents. From the Greenpoint Terminal it took 6 minutes to get here. A Mr. Sherman was the ticket agent and his office, café, and summer garden were at Graham Avenue and Skillman Street. Many of the trains on the Evergreen Branch that ran on weekends were express trains making limited stops between Greenpoint and Bay Ridge. This was a source of annoyance for people at the stations that were skipped. The railroad tried to fix this problem by making the local stops flag stops. This didn't always solve the problem as there is one account of a large crowd waiting for a beach train at Humboldt St that almost rioted on August 11, 1878. This was because several express trains had passed, but no local stops were made. The people on the platforms waiting for the train were angry and threatened to tear down the waiting rooms, and in response an agent was sent to the station house for assistance. Several policemen were sent to the station to calm the crowd until the train came.

On July 4, 1883, a Greenpoint train struck a Calvary Cemetery open horse car #42 at the nearby Humboldt Street crossing. Cars were smashed and there was one fatality. Humboldt Street was closed on September 28, 1885, and in later years it became a carpenters shop.

References

External links
EVERGREEN BRANCH: another lost LIRR line (Forgotten New York)
Bushwick Branch Approximation
Arrts Archives THE  L.I.R.R.'S  EVERGREEN BRANCH

Former Long Island Rail Road stations in New York City
Railway stations closed in 1885
Railway stations in the United States opened in 1878
Railway stations in Brooklyn
1878 establishments in New York (state)
1885 disestablishments in New York (state)
Williamsburg, Brooklyn